Peter Daicos (born 20 September 1961) is a former professional Australian rules footballer who played his entire 250-game career with the Collingwood Football Club in the VFL/AFL.

Daicos is considered one of the greatest-ever players in Australian Football history due to his brilliant 549-goal, 15-year career that earned him entry to the Australian Football Hall of Fame. His honours include the inaugural 1990 AFL Premiership with Collingwood and the 1991 Goal of the Year. He also represented his home state of Victoria a total of five times.

Daicos is considered to be one of Collingwood's all-time greats, being named in the club's Team of the Century in the forward pocket, leading the club's goalkicking for five seasons, winning the best-and-fairest award twice, and playing in the club's drought-breaking 1990 premiership.

Personal life
Daicos is commonly known as the Macedonian Marvel as a result of his ethnic Macedonian ancestry.

His parents were Macedonian immigrants from the village of Vevi in Greek Macedonia and was raised in a family with the Macedonian language spoken at home and church services attended on Sundays but with an important difference being his interest in Australian rules football instead of soccer, including playing with the school team whilst at Preston East High School.

His eldest son, Josh, was drafted to Collingwood with pick 57 in the 2016 national draft under the father–son rule. Another son, Nick, was also recruited through the father–son rule by Collingwood, selected with pick 4 in the 2021 national draft after the Gold Coast Suns’ bid for Nick Daicos was matched by the Magpies. Both Daicos brothers played for the Oakleigh Chargers in the TAC Cup in their draft years.

VFL/AFL Career
Peter Daicos debuted with the Collingwood Football Club in Round 4, 1979, against , in what was, at the time, the largest winning margin in VFL/AFL history (179 points). He went on to play 250 games (for 549 goals) with the Magpies until his retirement in 1993, and he won a premiership with them in 1990; he kicked Collingwood's first goal in that match.

In the 1990 season, Daicos scored 97 goals playing mostly from the forward pocket, a feat made all the more remarkable because he was considerably shorter than many full-forwards of the era and was not playing in the traditional position of a spearhead full-forward. His skills in scoring from seemingly impossible angles, as well as his ability to get rid of defenders, led pundits to start naming him "The Magician".

In fact, one of his goals, which drew the 1990 Qualifying Final, became the subject of a Toyota Memorable Moments advertisement, first screened in 2005.

In 1999, Daicos was inducted into the Australian Football Hall of Fame. In 2002, he was elected in the AFL Greek Team of the Century, a team reserved for players having full or partial Greek heritage; despite Daicos being an ethnic Macedonian, his family hometown is in Greece and was thus eligible for inclusion.

In 2005, Peter Daicos became coach at a local club called the Greythorn Falcons, and in 2006 he coached them to an 80-point win in the Grand Final.

In 2007/08, he launched SportzStats, a hybrid online/offline sports statistics tracking and diary system for junior players in various sports, and, as of 2009, he is also a weekly guest tipper on the Score Five Footy tipping game.

In 2010, Daicos resumed commentating duties with the AFL Live radio team.

Legacy 
Nowadays, his name is regularly used by journalists, commentators, and Australian football fans as an adjective to describe a difficult goal scored from the boundary in play, especially one that is dribbled along the ground in a controlled manner; such feats may be referred to as a 'Daicos-style goal'. His son Josh scored Goal of the Year for his single-handed effort from the boundary in Round 10 to seal a victory against Sydney in a style reminiscent of one of his father's snap goals.

See also
List of VFL/AFL players by ethnicity

References

 
 Australian Football Hall of Fame

External links

Peter Daicos web site

Peter Daicos: The Top 35

Australian Football Hall of Fame inductees
Collingwood Football Club players
Collingwood Football Club Premiership players
Copeland Trophy winners
Victorian State of Origin players
Living people
Australian rules footballers from Melbourne
Australian people of Macedonian descent
Slavic speakers of Greek Macedonia
1961 births
One-time VFL/AFL Premiership players